Armash is a village in the Ararat Municipality of the Ararat Province of Armenia. Armash has a population of 2,644, most of whom are farmers. The main crops produced are watermelons and tomatoes. The Armash Important Bird Area is nearby.

References 

 
Report of the results of the 2001 Armenian Census

Populated places in Ararat Province